Lebanon Valley Mall is a shopping mall located on the north side of U.S. Route 422 just west of Lebanon, Pennsylvania, United States. Opened on September 10, 1975, the mall features Boscov's, Hobby Lobby, Planet Fitness, and PriceRite as its anchor stores.

History

The site started with a Boscov's Department Store in August 1972 and the mall was completed in 1975. The Boscov's store at Lebanon Valley Mall was the first Boscov's location outside of Berks County. Lebanon Valley Mall Company built the mall on U.S. Route 422 on the west side of town. Boscov's served as one of the original anchor stores along with G. C. Murphy's discount division, Murphy's Mart. Other major tenants upon opening included Acme Markets, Rea & Derrick drugstore, Kinney Shoes, RadioShack, Zales Jewelers, Hardee's, General Nutrition Center, Waldenbooks, and a movie theater. Boscov's is the parent company of the Lebanon Valley Mall Company, the malls developer. In 1988, following the closure of the Acme Markets grocery store, Boscov's expanded into that space.

Work on the next major expansion began in 1996 and JCPenney became a new anchor, but has since closed. Great Escape Lebanon Valley 10 opened at the mall in 2006, and was later changed to a Regal in 2014. The mall previously had a Fox Theater. Hobby Lobby was announced to open at the mall in 2010, using the former JCPenney. Planet Fitness opened in early 2014, using part of the former Ames space. Price Rite opened in June 2015.

See also
List of shopping malls in Pennsylvania

References

External links
 Lebanon Valley Mall

Shopping malls established in 1975
Shopping malls in Pennsylvania
1975 establishments in Pennsylvania
Buildings and structures in Lebanon County, Pennsylvania
Shopping malls in Harrisburg, Pennsylvania